Nadia Ali is a Pakistani-American singer-songwriter. She rose to fame in 2001 as the frontwoman of the house act iiO with their single "Rapture". With iiO, she released the studio album Poetica.  She left the group in 2005 to embark on a solo career, while the group continued to release album featuring her on vocals most notably the 2011 studio album Exit 110.

Her first release after leaving the group was a collaboration with Armin van Buuren titled "Who is Watching" released on his 2005 album Shivers. She released her solo album Embers in 2009. The first single for the album was "Crash and Burn", which she wrote herself. Ali wrote all the songs on the album herself except "Promises", which was written by Paul Bosko.

Ali has gone on to become an oft-requested vocalist in electronic dance music and has released songs with DJs such as Sander van Doorn, BT and Morgan Page. Songs included in this list are from her studio albums and collaborations with other recordings artists on their respective albums and non-album singles.

Songs

See also
 Nadia Ali discography

Notes

References

External links
List of Nadia Ali songs at AllMusic

Nadia Ali (singer) songs
Nadia Ali